The Royal Norwegian Council for Scientific and Industrial Research or NTNF was the first of five research councils established in Norway. It existed from 1946 until the end of 1992, when the five merged to create The Research Council of Norway. The council was partially independent, but was ultimately subordinate to the Ministry of Trade and Industry.

References

Defunct government agencies of Norway
1946 establishments in Norway
Government agencies established in 1946
Government agencies disestablished in 1992
Research institutes in Norway
Organisations based in Oslo
Research Council of Norway